is a Japanese manga series created by Kaishaku. The series centers on the exploits of a race of pet cats, drawn as catgirls and the occasional catboy.

A 12-episode anime television series adaptation animated by Madhouse and TNK aired from July 5, 2001, to September 27, 2001.

Summary
Taruto is a little catgirl who at the beginning of the series moves to a new house in a huge city with her human owner Iori Monaka and his teenage niece Kinako. Taruto spends her days making friends and exploring her new home town; in reality Taruto is a legendary princess with special magic powers. Almost none of Taruto's friends believe that she's capable of using magic or that she's a princess from a faraway kingdom, but Taruto is determined to prove it to them no matter what happens.

Characters

Animals
 
 
 The protagonist of the story, Taruto is believed to be the legendary Kinka princess. She often is found goofing around and talking with her master, Iori, who she admires deeply, to the point she has a crush on him despite Iori's being human and calls him her fiancé.  She loves adventure, and she is often bullied by Charlotte.  She says "meow" ("nyan") after almost every phrase she says, though she is the only cat who does this. Taruto usually has frustration when Iori doesn't understand her when she tries to communicate. In the final episode it is revealed that the Kinka kingdom had two princesses. Taruto is the older sister of the twins.
 
 
 Charlotte's past remains mysterious, as to her name was given by an elder, but it is known that she escaped from the pound.  Because of this past, she has shown great disliking of caged, or as she thinks of it, "imprisoned" animals. Charlotte is known for her stubborn attitude, and doubts that Taruto is really the Kinka princess. Charlotte has however tried to be kind to Taruto, such as trying to help her escape from Anzunko, though she only did this because she claimed it was her "duty."
 
 
 She has a quiet and graceful personality and seems very much the epitome of the proper Japanese girl, wearing an all-day green kimono as her everyday clothing-wear. She seems bubbly and particularly joyful. But even though she is very polite, Chitose never hesitates to speak her mind. She once had a lady cat who named Tort, but she passed on. She Chitose has a rather strange fixation with Taruto's tail. Even though their personalities are quite different, she is best friends with Charlotte.
 
 
 Ever since he was trapped in Iori's ceiling and Taruto rescued him, Kakipi has been Taruto's trusted sidekick. He appears to be a flying squirrel, but has difficulty flying. He was the one who came up with the idea that Taruto may be the Kinka princess, and believes this with all of his heart. He is usually trying to break Taruto of her lazy habits, but finds this job very difficult.
 
 
 Chips is the leader of her mall team with her brother Nachos. Her name in Japanese, Potechi roughly translates to "Potato Chips." She is a "rebel", and has an obsession with collecting shiny objects. She dislikes Taruto, believing that she is "weak". She has somewhat of a boyish appearance. She has one way or another an annoyance to her brother's attraction to Taruto. Chips once stole Iori's good luck charm, a small bottle, but after Nachos broke one of Chips' collected bottles, she realized how bad Iori must feel, and she reluctantly returns it.
 
 
 Nachos' gender is often confused because of his appearance, but he is actually a boy. He is calm and laid-back, and is Chips' partner and brother, who refers to his sister Chips as "boss". And he will always do what she says. He has a crush on Taruto, and even helps her and the group, such as when he came up with a plan to rescue a cat which was trapped in a house.
 
 
 The wise and long-lived Chiffon is often found with her face in a book. She is very knowledgeable about all kinds of subjects. She is always seen when there is a problem, for her knowledge always comes up with a good solution. Chiffon was the one who took Charlotte in when she was a stray, and also gave Charlotte her name.
 
 
 Rakugan is a very old cat, possibly as old as Chiffon or older, and calls himself a master of magic. In reality, he only knows a few ninja tricks (such as his smoke bomb, which he commonly uses for escapes and entrances). In a way, Taruto wants him to be his teacher in magic. He is the one who taught Taruto to use the "Hail Tiger" spell, and is willing to give advice despite the fact it doesn't always work the way she expects.

Humans
 
 
 Iori is Taruto's kind master.  He is very gentle but easy-going. His hobby is making all kinds of sweets and foods, and he is very good at it. He is very affectionate towards Taruto, but, since he is a human, cannot understand her and sometimes frustrates her when she is trying to communicate with him, but he seems to only hear cat language because he cannot understand her. He is smitten with Anzuko Domyoji, but she shows no interest in him whatsoever.
 
 
 Kinako is Iori's niece, and is very fond of him. She has a vibrant, independent, tomboyish personality, and likes to go on all sorts of adventures. Kinako feels lonely when Iori, whom she lives with for unknown reasons, ignores her and spends his time trying to impress Anzuko. Though they were once rivals, she is good friends with Geppei.
 
 
 Anzuko is a cat collector, and once she has set her eyes on a cat, she will go to great lengths to catch it, possibly being the stereotype of a crazy cat lady. The first time she saw Taruto, she has wanted her for her cat collection. Since Iori would not give Taruto to her (despite his crush on Anzuko), so she decided to capture Taruto instead. Any time she sees Taruto she will give chase - even cutting through people's lawns, breaking other people's belongings, or pushing people forcibly out of her way. Her nickname that mostly close friends call her is "Anko."
 
 
 Geppei Okaki thinks he is better than everyone else, and acts like he is the boss of the town. However, his ex-rival, Kinako, set him straight. When they first met, they were enemies, but soon put their differences aside and became close friends, and often go on adventures together. Gallette, one of the few cat boys in the series, is his pet and goes everywhere with him. He has a pet cat named Gelette, who Taruto usually talks to for questions.

Episode list

Theme songs

Opening Theme
 
 Lyrics by: Masaaki Taniguchi
 Composition and Arranged by: Masumi Itō
 Song by: Masumi Itō

Ending Theme
 
 Lyrics by: Masaaki Taniguchi
 Composition and Arranged by: Masumi Itō
 Song by: Magical Nyan Nyan (Hisayo Mochizuki, Masayo Kurata, Maria Yamamoto)

External links
 Bandai Channel Official website 
 Kyou no Hana - A Magical Nyan Nyan Taruto Fansite
 

2001 anime television series debuts
Bandai Entertainment anime titles
Kemonomimi
Madhouse (company)
Seinen manga
Shueisha franchises
Shueisha manga
TNK (company)
Wowow original programming